Sir Arthur Stanley  (18 November 1869 – 4 November 1947) was a British Conservative politician, humanitarian, and Chairman of the Joint War Organisation of the British Red Cross Society and the Order of Saint John of Jerusalem in England during World War I and World War II.

Biography
Arthur Stanley was born on 18 November 1869, the third son of Lord Frederick Stanley (later 16th Earl of Derby) and Lady Constance Villiers (later Countess of Derby). He was one of ten siblings, though two did not survive childhood: his twin brother, Geoffrey, died on 16 March 1871 and his sister, Katherine Mary, died later that same year on 21 October. He relocated to Canada with his family after his father was appointed Governor General of Canada in 1888 and became an avid ice hockey player. He was a member of the Rideau Hall Rebels, one of the first ice hockey teams in Canada, and played alongside his older brother Edward (later 17th Earl of Derby).

The family returned to England in 1893 and Stanley was elected as Member of Parliament (MP) for Ormskirk in 1898, a position he held until 1918. He was Provincial Grand Master of the Isle of Man Freemasons from 1902 to 1912 and had a Lodge named in his honour, he was also Chairman of the Royal Automobile Club from 1905 to 1936 and Treasurer of St Thomas' Hospital from 1917 to 1943. He had been knighted for his services in 1917.

Stanley served as a senior member of the British Red Cross Society throughout much of his professional career and served as Chairman of the Joint War Organisation of the British Red Cross Society and of the Order of St John of Jerusalem throughout World War I and during World War II, 1939 to 1946.

Through his work for the British Red Cross and as an MP during the First World War, Stanley was aware of the challenge to find well-trained nurses.  Subsequently in 1916 Stanley became a co-founder of the College of Nursing (later the Royal College of Nursing) alongside Dame Sarah Swift, Dame Sidney Browne and Rachel Cox-Davies 

He died, unmarried, on 4 November 1947.

References

External links 
 

1869 births
1947 deaths
British humanitarians
Companions of the Order of the Bath
Conservative Party (UK) MPs for English constituencies
English ice hockey players
Knights Grand Cross of the Order of the British Empire
Knights Grand Cross of the Royal Victorian Order
Knights of Grace of the Order of St John
UK MPs 1895–1900
UK MPs 1900–1906
UK MPs 1906–1910
UK MPs 1910
UK MPs 1910–1918
Arthur

Younger sons of earls